Bremen is an unincorporated community in Saskatchewan.

References 

Bayne No. 371, Saskatchewan
Unincorporated communities in Saskatchewan
Division No. 15, Saskatchewan